Cornuboniscus is an extinct genus of prehistoric bony fish that lived during the Tournaisian stage of the Mississippian epoch.

Location
Cornubonisus was named after the island of Cornubian and species name after the coastal town of Bude in Cornwall. The type specimen is held in the town's Castle Heritage Centre.

See also

 Prehistoric fish
 List of prehistoric bony fish

References

Mississippian fish
Palaeonisciformes
Carboniferous fish of Europe